Peter Quinn, was an Irish Conservative Party Member of the Parliament of the United Kingdom who represented the constituency of Newry from 1859 to 1865.

References

External links 
 

Year of birth missing
Year of death missing
Irish Conservative Party MPs
Members of the Parliament of the United Kingdom for Newry (1801–1918)
UK MPs 1859–1865